Florence was an Irish priest in the first third of the twelfth century: the first recorded Archdeacon of Ardfert.

References

Archdeacons of Ardfert